The following is a list of Super Bowl broadcasters, that is, all of the national American television and radio networks and sports announcers that have broadcast the first four AFL-NFL World Championship Games and thereafter the championship games of the National Football League. It does not include any announcers who may have appeared on local radio broadcasts produced by the participating teams' flagship stations.

Super Bowl I is the only Super Bowl to have been broadcast in the U.S. by two networks simultaneously. At the time, NBC held the rights to nationally televise AFL games while CBS had the rights to broadcast NFL games. Both networks were allowed to cover the game, and each network used its own announcers, but NBC was only allowed to use the CBS feed instead of producing its own. Beginning with Super Bowl II, NBC televised the game in even years and CBS in odd years. This annual rotation between the two networks continued through the 1970 AFL–NFL merger when NBC was given the rights to televise AFC games and CBS winning the rights to broadcast NFC games. Although ABC began broadcasting Monday Night Football in 1970, it was not added to the Super Bowl rotation until Super Bowl XIX, played in January 1985. ABC, CBS and NBC then continued to rotate the Super Bowl until 1994, when Fox replaced CBS as the NFC broadcaster. CBS then took NBC's place in the rotation after the former replaced the later as the AFC broadcaster in 1998. As a result of new contracts signed in 2006, with NBC taking over Sunday Night Football from ESPN, and Monday Night Football moving from ABC to ESPN, NBC took ABC's place in the Super Bowl rotation. The rotation between CBS, Fox, and NBC will continue until the new contracts that will take effect starting in 2024, allowing ABC to return and starting a four-network rotation.

The NFL has broken the traditional broadcasting rotation at least twice. NBC originally had broadcasting rights for Super Bowl XXVI and CBS for Super Bowl XXVII, but the NFL allowed the networks to switch the two games in order to allow CBS a significant lead-in to its coverage of the 1992 Winter Olympics. Likewise, NBC was to air Super Bowl LV and CBS for Super Bowl LVI, but the two networks agreed to swap the broadcasting rights. Therefore, CBS benefitted from holding rights to the Super Bowl and the 2021 NCAA final Four, and NBC was allowed to pair its Super Bowl coverage with the 2022 Winter Olympics. Under the four-network rotation that will take effect in 2024, the league awarded NBC the Super Bowl during Winter Olympic years.

CBS has televised the most Super Bowl games, with Super Bowl LV as its 21st.

Television

English language
{| class="wikitable" style="font-size:1.00em; line-height:1.5em;"
|- bgcolor="#efefef"
!Game
!Game Date
!Network
!Play-by-play announcer
!Color commentator(s)
!Sideline reporter(s)
!Rules expert(s)
!Pregame host(s)
!Pregame analyst(s)
!Trophy presentation
!Notes

|-
|rowspan="2"| I
|rowspan="2"| January 15, 1967
|CBS
|Ray Scott (First Half)Jack Whitaker (Second Half)
|Frank Gifford
|Pat Summerall
|rowspan=45| Established for XLV
|
|
|Pat Summerall
|rowspan="2"|1
|-
|NBC
|Curt Gowdy
|Paul Christman
|Charlie Jones
|Jim Simpson
| colspan="2" |George Ratterman
|-
|II
|January 14, 1968
|CBS
|Ray Scott
|Pat Summerall and Jack Kemp
|Frank Gifford and Jack Whitaker
|
|
|Frank Gifford
|
|-
|III
|January 12, 1969
|NBC
|Curt Gowdy
|Kyle Rote and Al DeRogatis
|Jim Simpson
|Curt Gowdy
|Kyle Rote and Al DeRogatis
|Jim Simpson
|
|-
|IV
|January 11, 1970
|CBS
|Jack Buck
|Pat Summerall
|Frank Gifford and Jack Whitaker
|
|
|Frank Gifford
|
|-
|V
|January 17, 1971
|NBC
|Curt Gowdy
|Kyle Rote
|Bill Enis
|Curt Gowdy
|Joe Namath 
|Bill Enis
|
|-
|VI
|January 16, 1972
|CBS
|Ray Scott
|Pat Summerall
|Tom Brookshier
|Jack Whitaker
|
|Tom Brookshier
|
|-
|VII
|January 14, 1973
|NBC
|Curt Gowdy
|Al DeRogatis
|Bill Enis
|Curt Gowdy
|Joe Namath 
|Bill Enis
|
|-
|VIII
|January 13, 1974
|CBS
|Ray Scott
|Pat Summerall and Bart Starr
|Tom Brookshier
|Jack Whitaker
|
|Tom Brookshier
|
|-
| IX
| January 12, 1975
|NBC
|Curt Gowdy
|Al DeRogatis and Don Meredith
|Charlie Jones
|Jack Perkins
|Joe Namath and Don Meredith
|Charlie Jones
|
|-
|X
|January 18, 1976
|CBS
|Pat Summerall
|Tom BrookshierHank Stram (fourth quarter)
| 
|Brent Musburger
|Irv Cross, Phyllis George, and Jack Whitaker
|Tom Brookshier and Sonny Jurgensen
|
|-
|XI
|January 9, 1977
|NBC
|Curt Gowdy
|Don Meredith
|
|Lee Leonard and Bryant Gumbel
|John Brodie
|Bryant Gumbel
|
|-
|XII
|January 15, 1978
|CBS
|Pat Summerall
|Tom Brookshier
|Paul Hornung and Nick Buoniconti
|Brent Musburger
|Irv Cross, Phyllis George, and Jimmy "The Greek" Snyder
|Gary Bender
|
|-
|XIII
|January 21, 1979
|NBC
|Curt Gowdy
|John Brodie and Merlin Olsen
|
|Dick Enberg
|Bryant Gumbel, Mike Adamle, Donna De Varona, and Fran Tarkenton
|Mike Adamle
|
|-
|XIV
|January 20, 1980
|CBS
|Pat Summerall
|Tom Brookshier
|
|Brent Musburger
|Irv Cross, Jayne Kennedy, Jimmy "The Greek" Snyder, John Madden, and George Allen
|Brent Musburger
|
|-
|XV
|January 25, 1981
|NBC
|Dick Enberg
|Merlin Olsen
|John Brodie and Len Dawson
|Bryant Gumbel
|Mike Adamle, Pete Axthelm, and Bob Trumpy
|Bryant Gumbel
|
|-
|XVI
|January 24, 1982
|CBS
|Pat Summerall
|John Madden
|Irv Cross and Phyllis George
|Brent Musburger
|Jimmy "The Greek" Snyder, Terry Bradshaw, and Roger Staubach
|Brent Musburger
|
|-
|XVII
|January 30, 1983
|NBC
|Dick Enberg
|Merlin Olsen
|Bill Macatee
|Len Berman
|Mike Adamle, Pete Axthelm, and Ahmad Rashad
|Mike Adamle
|
|-
|XVIII
|January 22, 1984
|CBS
|Pat Summerall
|John Madden
|Irv Cross and Jim Hill
|Brent Musburger
|Pat O'Brien, Phyllis George, Jimmy "The Greek" Snyder, Dick Vermeil, Charlsie Cantey, and Tom Brookshier
|Brent Musburger
|
|-
|XIX
|January 20, 1985
|ABC
|Frank Gifford
|Don Meredith and Joe Theismann
|
|Al Michaels and Jim Lampley
|O. J. Simpson and Tom Landry
|Jim Lampley
|
|-
|XX
|January 26, 1986
|NBC
|Dick Enberg
|Merlin Olsen and Bob Griese
|Bill Macatee
|Bob Costas
|Pete Axthelm and Ahmad Rashad
|Bob Costas
|
|-
|XXI
|January 25, 1987
|CBS
|Pat Summerall
|John Madden
|Irv Cross and Will McDonough
|Brent Musburger
|Jimmy "The Greek" Snyder, Dan Dierdorf, Terry Bradshaw, and Joe Theismann
|Brent Musburger
|
|-
|XXII
|January 31, 1988
|ABC
|Al Michaels
|Frank Gifford and Dan Dierdorf
|Jack Whitaker, Jim Hill, and Becky Dixon
|Keith Jackson 
|Lynn Swann and Mike Adamle
|Keith Jackson
|
|-
|XXIII
|January 22, 1989
|NBC
|Dick Enberg
|Merlin Olsen
|Jim Gray
|Bob Costas and Gayle Gardner
|Paul Maguire and Don Shula
|Bob Costas
|
|-
|XXIV
|January 28, 1990
|CBS
|Pat Summerall
|John Madden
|Irv Cross and Will McDonough
|Brent Musburger
|Terry Bradshaw, Mike Ditka, Ken Stabler, and Dan Fouts
|Brent Musburger
|
|-
|XXV
|January 27, 1991
|ABC
|Al Michaels
|Frank Gifford and Dan Dierdorf
|Lynn Swann and Jack Arute
|Brent Musburger
|Dick Vermeil and Bob Griese
|Brent Musburger
|
|-
|XXVI
|January 26, 1992
|CBS
|Pat Summerall
|John Madden
|Lesley Visser, Pat O'Brien, and Jim Gray
|Greg Gumbel
|Terry Bradshaw, Dan Fouts, and Randy Cross
|Lesley Visser
|2
|-
|XXVII
|January 31, 1993
|NBC
|Dick Enberg
|Bob Trumpy
|O. J. Simpson and Todd Christensen
|Bob Costas
|Mike Ditka
|Bob Costas
|
|-
|XXVIII
|January 30, 1994
|NBC
|Dick Enberg
|Bob Trumpy
|O. J. Simpson and Will McDonough
|Jim Lampley and Bob Costas
|Mike Ditka and Joe Gibbs
|Jim Lampley
|3
|-
|XXIX
|January 29, 1995
|ABC
|Al Michaels
|Frank Gifford and Dan Dierdorf
|Lynn Swann and Lesley Visser
|Brent Musburger
|Dick Vermeil and Boomer Esiason
|Brent Musburger
|
|-
|XXX
|January 28, 1996
|NBC
|Dick Enberg
|Phil Simms and Paul Maguire
|Jim Gray and Will McDonough
|Greg Gumbel and Ahmad Rashad
|Mike Ditka, Joe Gibbs, and Joe Montana
|Greg Gumbel
|
|-
|XXXI
|January 26, 1997
|Fox
|Pat Summerall
|John Madden
|Ron Pitts and Bill Maas
|James Brown
|Terry Bradshaw, Howie Long, and Ronnie Lott
|Terry Bradshaw
|
|-
|XXXII
|January 25, 1998
|NBC
|Dick Enberg
|Phil Simms and Paul Maguire
|Jim Gray and John Dockery
|Greg Gumbel and Ahmad Rashad
|Cris Collinsworth, Sam Wyche, and Joe Gibbs
|Greg Gumbel
|
|-
|XXXIII
|January 31, 1999
|Fox
|Pat Summerall
|John Madden
|Ron Pitts and Bill Maas
|James Brown
|Terry Bradshaw, Howie Long, and Cris Collinsworth
|Terry Bradshaw
|
|-
|XXXIV
|January 30, 2000
|ABC
|Al Michaels
|Boomer Esiason
|Lesley Visser and Lynn Swann
|Chris Berman
|Steve Young
|Mike Tirico
|
|-
|XXXV
|January 28, 2001
|CBS
|Greg Gumbel
|Phil Simms
|Armen Keteyian and Bonnie Bernstein
|Jim Nantz
|Mike Ditka, Craig James, Randy Cross, and Jerry Glanville
|Jim Nantz
|
|-
|XXXVI
|February 3, 2002
|Fox
|Pat Summerall
|John Madden
|Pam Oliver and Ron Pitts
|James Brown
|Terry Bradshaw, Howie Long, and Cris Collinsworth
|Terry Bradshaw
|
|-
|XXXVII
|January 26, 2003
|ABC
|Al Michaels
|John Madden
|Melissa Stark and Lynn Swann
|Chris Berman
|Steve Young, Michael Strahan, and Brian Billick
|Mike Tirico
|
|-
|XXXVIII
|February 1, 2004
|CBS
|Greg Gumbel
|Phil Simms
|Armen Keteyian and Bonnie Bernstein
|Jim Nantz
|Dan Marino, Deion Sanders, and Boomer Esiason
|Jim Nantz
|
|-
|XXXIX
|February 6, 2005
|Fox
|Joe Buck
|Troy Aikman and Cris Collinsworth
|Pam Oliver and Chris Myers
|James Brown
|Terry Bradshaw, Howie Long, and Jimmy Johnson
|Terry Bradshaw
|
|-
|XL
|February 5, 2006
|ABC
|Al Michaels
|John Madden
|Michele Tafoya and Suzy Kolber
|Chris Berman and Mike Tirico
|Steve Young, Michael Irvin, and Tom Jackson (main set)Bill Belichick (2nd set)
|Mike Tirico
|
|-
|XLI
|February 4, 2007
|CBS
|Jim Nantz
|Phil Simms
|Lesley Visser, Sam Ryan, Steve Tasker, and Solomon Wilcots
|James Brown
|Dan Marino, Shannon Sharpe, and Boomer Esiason
|Jim Nantz
|
|-
|XLII
|February 3, 2008
|Fox
|Joe Buck
|Troy Aikman
|Pam Oliver and Chris Myers
|Curt Menefee
|Terry Bradshaw, Howie Long, and Jimmy Johnson
|Terry Bradshaw
|
|-
|XLIII
|February 1, 2009
|NBC
|Al Michaels
|John Madden
|Andrea Kremer and Alex Flanagan
|Bob Costas, Dan Patrick and Keith Olbermann
|Cris Collinsworth, Jerome Bettis, Tiki Barber, Matt Millen, Tony Dungy, Mike Holmgren, and Rodney Harrison
|Dan Patrick
|
|-
|XLIV
|February 7, 2010
|CBS
|Jim Nantz
|Phil Simms
|Steve Tasker and Solomon Wilcots
|James Brown
|Dan Marino, Bill Cowher, Shannon Sharpe, and Boomer Esiason
|Jim Nantz
|
|-
|XLV
|February 6, 2011
|Fox
|Joe Buck
|Troy Aikman
|Pam Oliver and Chris Myers
|Mike Pereira
|Curt Menefee
|Terry Bradshaw, Howie Long, Michael Strahan, and Jimmy Johnson
|Terry Bradshaw
|
|-
|XLVI
|February 5, 2012
|NBC
|Al Michaels
|Cris Collinsworth
|Michele Tafoya
|
|Bob Costas and Dan Patrick
|Tony Dungy, Rodney Harrison, Aaron Rodgers, and Hines Ward
|Dan Patrick
|
|-
|XLVII
|February 3, 2013
|CBS
|Jim Nantz
|Phil Simms
|Steve Tasker, Solomon Wilcots, and Tracy Wolfson
|
|James Brown and Greg Gumbel
|Dan Marino, Bill Cowher, Shannon Sharpe, Boomer Esiason, Clay Matthews, and Larry Fitzgerald
|Jim Nantz
|
|-
|XLVIII
|February 2, 2014
|Fox
|Joe Buck
|Troy Aikman
|Pam Oliver and Erin Andrews
|Mike Pereira
|Curt Menefee
|Howie Long, Michael Strahan, and Jimmy Johnson
|Michael Strahan
|4
|-
|XLIX
|February 1, 2015
|NBC
|Al Michaels
|Cris Collinsworth
|Michele Tafoya
|
|Bob Costas and Dan Patrick
|Tony Dungy, Rodney Harrison, Hines Ward, and John Harbaugh
|Dan Patrick
|
|-
|50
|February 7, 2016
|CBS
|Jim Nantz
|Phil Simms
|Tracy Wolfson, Evan Washburn, and Jay Feely
|Mike Carey
|James Brown, Ian Eagle, and Greg Gumbel
|Tony Gonzalez, Bill Cowher, Bart Scott, Boomer Esiason, Sean Payton, Brandon Marshall, Trent Green, Steve Smith Sr., and Amy Trask
|Jim Nantz
|
|-
|LI
|February 5, 2017 
|Fox
|Joe Buck
|Troy Aikman
|Erin Andrews and Chris Myers
|Mike Pereira
|Curt Menefee
|Terry Bradshaw, Howie Long, Michael Strahan, and Jimmy Johnson
|Terry Bradshaw
|
|-
|LII
|February 4, 2018
|NBC
|Al Michaels
|Cris Collinsworth
|Michele Tafoya
|
|Dan Patrick and Liam McHugh
|Tony Dungy, Rodney Harrison, Chris Simms, and John Harbaugh
|Dan Patrick
|
|-
|LIII
|February 3, 2019
|CBS
|Jim Nantz 
|Tony Romo
|Tracy Wolfson, Evan Washburn, and Jay Feely
|Gene Steratore
|James Brown and Ian Eagle
|Bill Cowher, Nate Burleson, Boomer Esiason, Phil Simms, Russell Wilson, and Von Miller
|Jim Nantz
|
|-
|LIV
|February 2, 2020
|Fox
|Joe Buck
|Troy Aikman
|Erin Andrews and Chris Myers
|Mike Pereira
|Curt Menefee
|Terry Bradshaw, Howie Long, Michael Strahan, and Jimmy Johnson
|Terry Bradshaw
|
|-
|LV
|February 7, 2021
|CBS
|Jim Nantz 
|Tony Romo
|Tracy Wolfson, Evan Washburn, and Jay Feely
|Gene Steratore
|James Brown and Ian Eagle
|Bill Cowher, Nate Burleson, Boomer Esiason, Phil Simms, and Charles Davis
|Jim Nantz
|rowspan="2"|5
|-
|LVI
|February 13, 2022
|NBC
|Al Michaels
|Cris Collinsworth
|Michele Tafoya and Kathryn Tappen
|Terry McAulay
|Mike Tirico, Maria Taylor, and Jac Collinsworth
|Tony Dungy, Drew Brees, Rodney Harrison, and Chris Simms
|Mike Tirico
|-
| LVII
|February, 12, 2023
|Fox
|Kevin Burkhardt
|Greg Olsen
|Erin Andrews and Tom Rinaldi|Mike Pereira
|Curt Menefee 
|Terry Bradshaw, Howie Long, Michael Strahan, Jimmy Johnson, and Rob Gronkowski
|Terry Bradshaw
|
|-
|LVIII
|February 11, 2024
|CBS
|colspan="7"|TBD
|rowspan="11"|6|-
|LIX
|February 9, 2025
|Fox
|colspan="7"|TBD
|-
|LX
|February 8, 2026
|NBC
|colspan="7"|TBD
|-
|LXI
|February 14, 2027
|ABC
|colspan="7"|TBD
|-
|LXII
|February 13, 2028
|CBS
|colspan="7"|TBD
|-
|LXIII
|February 11, 2029
|Fox
|colspan="7"|TBD
|-
|LXIV
|February 10, 2030
|NBC
|colspan="7"|TBD
|-
|LXV
|February 9, 2031
|ABC
|colspan="7"|TBD
|-
|LXVI
|February 8, 2032
|CBS
|colspan="7"|TBD
|-
|LXVII
|February 13, 2033
|Fox
|colspan="7"|TBD
|-
|LXVIII
|February 12, 2034
|NBC
|colspan="7"|TBD
|}

Notes

 : Super Bowl I was simulcast on both CBS (at the time the sole NFL network) and NBC (the AFL network). From Super Bowl II onward, the networks began rotating exclusive coverage of the game on an annual basis. Super Bowls I–VI were blacked out in the television markets of the host cities, due to league restrictions then in place.

 : The 1989 television contract (which was in effect) gave CBS Super Bowl XXVI instead of Super Bowl XXVII, which was in their rotation. The NFL swapped the CBS and NBC years in an effort to give CBS enough lead-in programming for the upcoming 1992 Winter Olympics two weeks later.

 : The television contract for 1990–1993 had each network having one Super Bowl telecast of the first three games as part of the package. The fourth Super Bowl (XXVIII) was up for a separate sealed bid. NBC won the bid, and since they were last in the rotation for Super Bowl coverage in the regular contract, ended up with two straight Super Bowls. CBS is the only other network to televise two Super Bowls (I and II) in a row. It is also of note that Super Bowls XXVII and XXVIII are the first (and to date, only) back-to-back Super Bowls to feature the same two teams (Dallas Cowboys and Buffalo Bills).

 : Michael Strahan was a last-minute substitute for the Vince Lombardi Trophy presentation ceremony, as Terry Bradshaw (who has normally covered the Lombardi Trophy presentation ceremonies for Super Bowls airing on Fox) left the New Jersey/New York area the day before Super Bowl XLVIII to fly home due to the death of his father.

 : Under the 2013 television contract, Super Bowl LV was originally assigned to NBC, while Super Bowl LVI was originally assigned to CBS. In March 2019, CBS agreed to trade Super Bowl LVI to NBC in exchange for Super Bowl LV so that the former would not have to compete against the 2022 Winter Olympics.

 : The 2021 NFL television contract gives Super Bowl rights through the 2033 season, starting with the 2023 season.

See also
 The NFL Today Fox NFL Sunday The NFL on NBC pregame show Football Night in America''

Spanish language

Radio

References

External links
Tom Hoffarth of the Los Angeles Daily News breaks down the Super Bowl by play-by-play announcer.
Only 11 have called TV's biggest game - Times Union
The best and worst analysts in the booth
Pat Summerall and John Madden top list of greatest broadcast booths in Super Bowl history - NY Daily News
SUPER BOWL BROADCASTERS HISTORY (1967-2013)
Ranking the best and worst Super Bowl announcers, from John Madden to Phil Simms
Ranking every Super Bowl broadcast announcer
The best of the best; ranking all-time top Super Bowl play-by-play voices; From Al Michaels to Ray Scott

National Football League on the radio
Lists of National Football League announcers
Broadcasters
ABC Sports
CBS Sports
Fox Sports announcers
NFL on NBC
CBS Radio Sports
NBC Radio Sports
Westwood One